Aua / King Billy Island is a small island and Scenic Reserve in Lyttelton Harbour / Whakaraupō on Banks Peninsula, New Zealand.

Location and description

It is composed of Charteris Bay Sandstone, with a thin layer of soil supporting forest.

Name
The Māori name is considered to mean "no name". The origin of the English name is unknown: it might refer to a comic book character, King William IV, or an Aboriginal Australian whaler Billy Lanny.

History
Archaeological sites are recorded on the island showing evidence of quarries, landing sites, and middens. In pre-European times, the island was a source for Māori of coarse sandstone used for grinding stone including pounamu (greenstone). As such the island has cultural significance to Ngāi Tahu, especially to Te Hapū o Ngāti Wheke (Rāpaki).  This sandstone was later quarried by colonists for the corners and facing of the Lyttelton Gaol, among other buildings.

The area was included in Walter Mantell's controversial securing of the harbour (then called Port Cooper) and surrounding land for the Crown in 1849. In April 1858 the island was part of a purchase by Mark Stoddart, and was subsequently sold to Thomas Potts, then to William Rolleston for public purposes. It was owned by the Anderson until 1975, then sold to the Crown. In 1979 it was classified as a Recreation Reserve, but in 1980 this was changed to a Scenic Reserve.

See also

 List of islands of New Zealand
 List of islands
 Desert island

References

Uninhabited islands of New Zealand
Islands of Canterbury, New Zealand